Johann David Heinichen (17 April 1683 – 16 July 1729) was a German Baroque composer and music theorist who brought the musical genius of Venice to the court of Augustus II the Strong in Dresden. After he died, Heinichen's music attracted little attention for many years. As a music theorist, he is credited as one of the inventors of the circle of fifths.

Biography
Johann David Heinichen was born in the small village of Krössuln (currently part of the town Teuchern, in Saxony-Anhalt) near Weissenfels. His father, Michael Heinichen, had studied music at the celebrated Thomasschule Leipzig associated with the Thomaskirche, served as cantor in Pegau and was pastor of the village church in Krössuln. Johann David also attended the Thomasschule Leipzig. There he studied music with Johann Schelle and later received organ and harpsichord lessons with Johann Kuhnau. The future composer Christoph Graupner was also a student of Kuhnau at the time.

Heinichen enrolled in 1702 to study law at the University of Leipzig and in 1705–1706 qualified as a lawyer (in the early 18th century the law was a favored route for composers; Kuhnau, Graupner and Georg Philipp Telemann were also lawyers). Heinichen practiced law in Weissenfels until 1709.

However, Heinichen maintained his interest in music and was concurrently composing operas. In 1710, he published the first edition of his major treatise on the thoroughbass. He went to Italy and spent seven formative years there, mostly in Venice, with great success with two operas, Mario and Le passioni per troppo amore (1713). Mario was staged again in Hamburg in 1716 with the German title, Calpurnia, oder die romische Grossmut.

In 1712, he taught music to Leopold, Prince of Anhalt-Köthen, who took him as composer. The same prince would appoint Johann Sebastian Bach Kapellmeister at the end of 1717. In 1716, Heinichen met in Venice Prince Augustus III of Poland, son of King Augustus II the Strong, and thanks to him was appointed the Royal-Polish and Electoral-Saxon Kapellmeister in Dresden. His pupils included Johann Georg Pisendel. In 1721, Heinichen married in Weissenfels; the birth of his only child is recorded as January 1723. In his final years, Heinichen's health suffered greatly; on the afternoon of 16 July 1729, he was buried in the Johannes cemetery after finally succumbing to tuberculosis.

His music began to be better known after 1992 when Musica Antiqua Köln under Reinhard Goebel recorded a selection of Dresden Concerti (Seibel 204, 208, 211, 213–215, 217, 226, 231–235, 240), followed by a recording of Heinichen's Lamentationes and Passionsmusik (1996). His sole opera for Dresden, Flavio Crispo (1720), was never performed and was not recorded until 2018. Two "passion oratorios", L'aride tempie ignude (1724?) and Come? S'imbruna il cieli Occhi piangete (1728) (classified in the catalogue as the cantatas Seibel 29 and 30), were recorded in 2021 by the Kölner Akademie.

Circle of fifths 

Heinichen is credited with independently inventing the circle of fifths (German: Musicalischer Circul) in his Neu erfundene und gründliche Anweisung (1711), though he was not the earliest inventor. The circle of fifths had previously been invented
by Nikolay Diletsky in the late 1670s (of which Heinichen was unaware). Heinichen credited Athanasius Kircher as a predecessor, specifically his Musurgia universalis (1650).

Works list

References

Further reading
Buelow, George J. 1966. "The Loci Topici and Affect in Late Baroque Music: Heinichen's Practical Demonstration". The Music Review 27:161–76.
Buelow, George J. 1992. Thorough-Bass Accompaniment According to Johann David Heinichen, third edition. Berkeley and Los Angeles: University of California Press.
Buelow, George J. 2001. "Heinichen, Johann David". The New Grove Dictionary of Music and Musicians, second edition, edited by Stanley Sadie and John Tyrrell. London: Macmillan Publishers.
Unger, Melvin P. 1990. The German Choral Church Compositions of Johann David Heinichen. American University Studies, Series 20: Fine Arts 14. New York: Peter Lang. .

External links

 Biography at classical.net
 Deutsche Grammophon catalogue entry of Heinichen CD, with audio samples 
 Urtext editions of instrumental music from Prima la musica!
 

1683 births
1729 deaths
18th-century classical composers
18th-century German composers
18th-century German male musicians
German Baroque composers
German classical composers
German male classical composers
German music theorists
People from Saxe-Weissenfels